Kano State (Hausa: Jihar Kanoجىِهَر كَنوُ) (Fula: Leydi Kano 𞤤𞤫𞤴𞤣𞤭 𞤳𞤢𞤲𞤮𞥅 ) is one of the 36 states of Nigeria, located in the northern region of the country. According to the national census done in 2006, Kano State is the most populous in Nigeria. The recent official estimates taken in 2016 by the National Bureau of Statistics found that Kano State was still the largest state by population in Nigeria. Created in 1967 out of the former Northern Region, Kano State borders Katsina State to the northwest, Jigawa State to the northeast, Bauchi State to the southeast, and Kaduna State to the southwest. The state's capital and largest city is the city of Kano, the second most populous city in Nigeria after Lagos.
The incumbent governor of the state is Abdullahi Umar Ganduje. He was sworn in on May 29, 2015.

Modern day Kano State was the site of a number of prior kingdoms and empires, including the Kingdom of Kano, which was centered in Dalla Hill and existed from prior to 1000 AD to 1349. In 1349, the Sultanate of Kano was established with Yaji I as its first Sultan. In the 15th century, Kurmi Market was opened, which helped Kano become a center of commercial activity in Hausaland; the market remains open in the 21st century and its historic importance is reflected in the state's nickname, the Centre of Commerce. During the 16th and 17th centuries, the Sultanate of Kano established itself as the most powerful of the Hausa Kingdoms. In 1903, the British Empire conquered the Kano Emirate, incorporating it region into the Northern Nigeria Protectorate. The major ethnic groups in pre-colonial Kano City were the Hausa, Fulani, Beriberi (Kanuri), Tuareg, Arab, Nupe, and some tribes from the southern Nigeria.  Most people in Kano city have come to use the Hausa language as a first language and some have accepted Hausa as an ethnic identification.

Since independence, Kano State has developed a diverse economy, establishing itself as a center for industry, agriculture, and Islamic banking. The Hausa and Fulani make up a majority of Kano State's population. The Hausa language is the dominant language in the state, as it is in most of Northern Nigeria. Challenges faced by Kano State in the 21st century include attacks by the Islamist terrorist group Boko Haram, inter-religious violence, and extreme poverty. A Muslim-majority state, Kano State is one of the twelve states in Nigeria to operate under Sharia law within the legal framework of the Nigerian Constitution.

History 

An important early center of commerce in the region was Kurmi Market, founded by the Emir of Kano Muhammadu Rumfa in 1463 CE. Subsequent leaders made contributions to the emergence of Kano as a leading commercial centre in Sudanic Africa. During the time of the Kano Emirate, Emir Ibrahim Dabo made a number of administrative reforms, seeking to increase commerce in the region.

Leaders during this time encouraged traders to move from Katsina, capitalising on raids from the Hausa Sultanate of Maradi. The Jihad leaders of the Caliphate encouraged the Kola nut trade, and Kano was the greatest beneficiary with an annual turnover of about $30 million. Craft industries also evolved in the pre-colonial period contributing to the prosperity of the province.

After a British occupation of the region, culminating in the Battle of Kano in February 1903, the region became a part of the Northern Nigeria Protectorate. Kano later became a part of the Northern Region of Nigeria. Kano state was created on May 27, 1967. In 1991, part of Kano State was separated to form Jigawa State.

Climate change 
The climate of Kano state is characterised by variability in rainfall between the 70s and 80s, with drought and near drought conditions. Between the 90s and the year 2015, the moisture conditions have improved considerably but for the fluctuation of the rainfall in the state. However, since 2015 till date, there has been an increase in rainfall in the state, which has helped increase agricultural production in this northern Nigerian state considerably. Based on the report of the Nigerian Meteorological Agency (NIMET), the amount of rainfall varies between years with a mean value of 897.7mm.

In the first quarter of 2022, the Nigerian Meteorological Agency sounded an early warning of floods in some states, including Kano state. The agency asserted that their warning was based on the amount and distribution of rainfall that had been observed in the nation during the rainy season. According to the Kano State Emergency Management Agency (SEMA), 25 local government districts experienced flooding as a result of the extreme rain's aftermath.

Temperature 
The temperature of Kano has been on the rise since the 60s and this is highly remarkable  The annual temperature of the state is between 260C to 300C of dumal temperature, which is high, and measurable  between the range of 13.1%, with the relative humidity of between 17% and 90% respectively.

Economy 
Many large markets exist within Kano today, such as Kurmi Market, Kantin Kwari Market, Sabon Gari Market, Kofar Wanbai Market, Galadima Market, Kurumi Market, Yankura Market and Dawanau Market. Many of these markets specialize in a certain product, such as textiles or grain.

Agriculture
Subsistence and commercial agriculture is mostly practised in the outlying districts of the state. Some of the food crops cultivated are millet, cowpeas, sorghum, maize and rice for local consumption while groundnuts and cotton are produced for export and industrial purposes. During the colonial period and several years after the country's independence, the groundnuts produced in the state constituted one of the major sources revenue of the country. Kano State is a major producer of hides and skins, sesame, soybean, cotton, garlic, gum arabic and chili pepper.

A 2018 study of Tudun Wada found that both temperature and rainfall were likely to increase with climate change, causing increased stress on crops, and would require increased climate change adaptation for agricultural practices.

Industry
Kano State is the second-largest industrial Centre after Lagos State in Nigeria and the largest in Northern Nigeria with textile, tanning, footwear, cosmetics, plastics, enamelware, pharmaceuticals, ceramics, furniture and other industries. Others include agricultural implements, soft drinks, food and beverages, dairy products, vegetable oil, animal feeds etc. Kano is also the center of a growing Islamic banking industry in Nigeria.

Tourism

The tourist attractions in the state include:

Kurmi Market established in the 15th century
Kano's centuries-old city wall
Gidan Rumfa (Emir's Palace, the oldest continuous site of authority in Nigeria)
Kano Zoo
Dala and Gwauron Dutse
Gidan Makama (Kano Museum)

Natural resources in Kano State
Kano State has different natural resources in abundant, these include

Mineral raw materials 
 Cassiterite
 Copper
 Gemstone 
 Glass-sand 
 Lead/Zinc
 Pyrochinre & Tantalite

Agro raw materials

Education

High school
 Dawakin Tofa Science College
 Rumfa College, Kano

 Day Science College, Kano
 Federal Government College, Kano.
 Federal Government Girls'College, Minjibir.
 Government Arabic Secondary School Kantsi
 Government Arabic Secondary School, Rogo
 Government Day Secondary School, Rogo Ruma
 Government Girls Arabic Secondary School, Rogo
 Government Girls Secondary School, Dala
 Government Girls Secondary School, Madobi
 Government Girls Secondary School, Rogo
 Government Girls Secondary School, Shekara
 Government Secondary School, Dala
 Government Secondary School, Gwale
 Government Secondary School, Gwammaja
 Government Secondary School, Kofar Nassarawa
 Government Secondary School, Kwalli
 Government Secondary School, Kwankwaso
 Government Secondary School, Madobi
 Government Secondary School, Rogo
 Government Secondary School, Sabuwar Kofa
 Government Secondary School, Sharada
 Government Secondary School, Warure
 Government Technical College Bagauda
 Government Technical College Danbatta
 Government Technical College Rogo
 Government Technical College Kano
 Government Technical College Ungogo
 Government Technical College Wudil
 Governors College Kano
 Hassana Sufi Government Girls Secondary School
 Maryam Aloma Government Girls Secondary School
 Mero Tijjani Science Secondary School, Kano
 Rogo Community Tahfizul Qur'an College
 Science Secondary School, Dawakin Kudu

Universities 
Kano State is home to five universities: one federal university, one regimented federal university, two states universities, and one private university.

Bayero University Kano (BUK), founded in 1977.
Kano State University of Technology  (KUST), founded in 2001.
Skyline University Nigeria (SUN), founded in 2018.
Yusuf Maitama Sule University, Kano (YUSMUK), founded in 2012.
Nigeria Police Academy Wudil, founded as the 37th federal university in 2011.

Polytechnics and Colleges 
The following is a list of the approved Polytechnics and Colleges in the state of Kano:
Aminu Kano College of Islamic Legal Studies, Kano
Audu Bako School of Agriculture, Dambatta
Federal College of Education, Kano
Kano State Polytechnic
 
Aminu Dabo School of Health Sciences & Technology
College of Arts, Sciences and Remedial Studies, Kano (CAS),
Emirate College of Science and Health Technology, Kano
Federal College of Agricultural Produce Technology, Kano
Federal College of Education, Technical Bichi
Rabi'u Musa Kwankwaso College of Advance and Remedial Studies, Tudun Wada (RMK CARS)
Sa'adatu Rimi College of Education, Kumbotso
School of Health Technology, Kano
School of Hygiene, Kano
School of Midwifery, Dambatta
School of Midwifery, Gwarzo
School of Nursing, Kano
School of Nursing, Madobi
School of Post Basic Midwifery, Gezawa

Research centres 
The following is a list of research centres and institutes in the state of Kano:
 
 Aminu Kano Centre for Democratic Research & Training
 Centre For Research and Documentation, Kano
 Digital Bridge Institute, Kano
 Hydraulic Equipment Development Institute, Kano
 Institute for Agricultural Research, Kano
 International Crops Research Institute for Semi Arid Tropics, Kano
 International Institute of Tropical Agriculture, Kano

Local government areas

Kano State consists of forty-four (44) Local Government Areas (LGAs). They are:

Demographics

Population 
According to the 2006 PON census figures from Nigeria Kano State had a population totaling 9,401,288. Officially, Kano State is the second most populous state in the country behind Lagos State. The state is mostly populated by the Hausa and Fulani people.

Languages
The official language of Kano State are Hausa and Fulfulde.

The Kainji languages Moro, Kurama and Map are also spoken in Doguwa LGA.

Notable people 

Sani Abacha (1943-1998), 10th Head of State of Nigeria
Ja'afar Mahmud Adam (1960-2007), popular Islamic scholar
Aminu Ala (born 1973), Hausa musician, author.
Mubarak Bala (born 1984), blasphemer, atheist, president of the Humanist Association of Nigeria
Aliko Dangote (born 1957), Nigerian business magnate and philanthropist
Aminu Dantata (born 1931), Nigerian business magnate and philanthropist
Rabiu Kwankwaso (born 1956), former minister of defence of Nigeria,
Murtala Muhammed from 1975 to 1976, 4th Military head of state of Nigeria
Abdul Samad Rabiu (was born 4 August 1960), Nigerian business magnate and philanthropist
Ibrahim Shekarau (born 1955), former Governor (2003-2011).
Sanusi Lamido Sanusi (born 1961), former CBN Governor,
Sani Umar Rijiyar Lemo, Islamic preacher
Bashir Aliyu Umar, Islamic preacher
Abdulwahab Abdallah, Islamic preacher

Politics
The state government is led by a democratically elected governor who works closely with the sate house of assembly. The capital city of the state is Kano

Electoral system

The governor of each state is selected using a modified two-round system. To be elected in the first round, a candidate must receive the plurality of the vote and over 25% of the vote in at least two -third of the State local government Areas. If no candidate passes threshold, a second round will be held between the top candidate and the next candidate to have received a plurality of votes in the highest number of local government Areas.

See also

 Kano State Government

References

Further reading

External links

National Bureau of Statistics Maps of Kano State

 
Sharia in Nigeria
States of Nigeria
States and territories established in 1967